Ward Brehm is a Minnesota businessman, leader in global humanitarian efforts and nationally known public speaker and commentator on relief and development in Africa.

Career
Brehm has now served at the pleasure of four U.S. presidents in his role with the United States African Development Foundation ("USADF") since he was first appointed to its board as chairman by President Bush in 2004.

He has also represented the United States as part of three presidential delegations to the African continent, having attended the inaugurations of the presidents of the Democratic Republic of Congo and Benin, as well the Leon Sullivan Summit in Tanzania.
 
In 2008, Brehm was awarded the Presidential Citizens Medal – the country's second-highest civilian honor – for his work in Africa at an Oval Office ceremony with President and Mrs. Bush.

Brehm brought his message as an advocate for the poor in Africa to the 2008 National Prayer Breakfast, where he gave the keynote address before an audience including the U.S. President, First Lady, foreign heads of state, most members of Congress and the Washington diplomatic community. Brehm was the first person from the business community to ever be asked by Congress to address this annual gathering in Washington DC.

Brehm continues to be an outspoken advocate for the African poor, bringing his message of hope for a more prosperous Africa to the White House, USAID and prayer breakfasts all over the country.

Brehm also serves as an unofficial diplomat, quietly behind the scenes connecting African and American leaders. He has also brought policymakers together from both sides of the aisle in Washington to unite and support African development initiatives. He has befriended numerous leaders in Africa and has helped facilitate small groups of praying leaders in many African nations.

As a member of the board of directors for Alight, which works with refugee communities around the world, Brehm founded Asili which is an innovative platform to bring clean water and basic medical care to the extreme poor using an enterprise platform. At Alight, he also founded and helped fund The Color Movement, which involved collaborating with the Catholic Sisters of El Salvador, who offer an alternative identity to a life of violence and desperation and one that thrives on goodness, peace, and unity.

In 2018, he was appointed to the Advisory Board of the United States Agency for International Development (USAID) in Washington DC. He has served in that captivity during both the Trump and Biden Administrations.  

He is the author of four books: Life Through A Different Lens, White Man Walking, Bigger than Me and a collection of personal poems, "Whispers in the Stillness."

Now retired from business, Ward Brehm is engaged full time in the non-profit world. In his former professional life, he was the founder and chairman of The Brehm Group, Inc., a Twin Cities insurance consulting firm. He and his wife, Kris, live in Minneapolis, Minnesota. They have three grown children: Andy, Mike and Sarah.

References

Year of birth missing (living people)
Living people
American businesspeople in insurance
People from Wayzata, Minnesota
Presidential Citizens Medal recipients